The Federation of American Societies for Experimental Biology (FASEB), based in Rockville, Maryland, is a non-profit organization of scientific societies in the United States. With a focus on the biological and biomedical sciences, the federation represents scientists in such fields as anatomy, physiology, immunology, biochemistry, molecular biology, toxicology, genetics, and nutrition.

Description
Founded in 1912, FASEB was established to provide a forum for biological and biomedical researchers enabling them to hold educational meetings, develop publications, and disseminate biological research results.

FASEB currently comprises 27 scientific societies. As a federation, FASEB's collective mission is to advance health and well-being by promoting research and education in the biological and biomedical sciences. 

To advance its mission, FASEB provides a variety of programs and services to its member societies to support their individual members, including advocating for federal funding for their research, hosting scientific conferences and meetings to share their research findings, publishing scientific journals to promote their research, working to create a diverse and representative workforce in the biological and biomedical sciences, and celebrating researchers’ efforts to advance the biological and biomedical sciences through an awards program.

Members
Membership in FASEB is limited to scientific societies. Societies are either Full or Associate members. Each member society shares a common vision for the advancement of research and education in the biological and biomedical sciences. 

Full Members
American Aging Association
American Association for Anatomy
American Association of Immunologists 
American College of Sports Medicine
American Federation for Medical Research
American Physiological Society
American Society for Biochemistry and Molecular Biology
American Society for Bone and Mineral Research
American Society for Clinical Investigation
American Society for Investigative Pathology
American Society for Pharmacology and Experimental Therapeutics
Association of Biomolecular Resource Facilities
Association for Molecular Pathology
Endocrine Society
Environmental Mutagenesis and Genomics Society
Genetics Society of America
The Histochemical Society
Shock Society
Society for Developmental Biology
Society for Glycobiology
Society for Experimental Biology and Medicine
Society for Leukocyte Biology
Society for Redox Biology and Medicine
Society for the Study of Reproduction

Associate Members
American Society of Human Genetics
American Society for Nutrition
Society for Birth Defects Research and Prevention

Publications
FASEB publishes two open access research journals:
FASEB Journal
FASEB BioAdvances

Both journals are peer-reviewed and cover research in the biological and biomedical sciences at every level of organization: atomic, molecular, cell, tissue, organ, organismic, and population. 

FASEB also publishes Washington Update, a bimonthly eNewsletter, which covers news on science policy and regulation, FASEB’s awards, meetings, research highlights, and human interest articles.

References

External links

Brief History of FASEB and Its Programs
FASEB Excellence in Science Award Recipients
FASEB Public Service Award Recipients

Scientific societies based in the United States
Biology organizations
Organizations established in 1912
1912 establishments in the United States
Scientific organizations established in the 1910s